The Humboldt meridian in California, longitude 124° 07' 10" west from Greenwich, intersects the base line on the summit of Mount Pierce at latitude 40° 25' 02" north (co-ordinates in NAD27 datum), and governs the surveys in the northwestern corner of California, lying west of the Coast Range of mountains, and north of township 5 south, of the Humboldt meridian system. This principal meridian was established in 1853.

See also
List of principal and guide meridians and base lines of the United States

References

External links

Geography of California
Meridians and base lines of the United States
Named meridians